Harbour Cruise Bauhinia is a sightseeing and dining cruise in Victoria Harbour, Hong Kong. As Bauhinia is the City Flower of Hong Kong and the regional emblem of Hong Kong. The brand is under Hong Kong Ferry Group.

Current Use 
The vessels are one of the tourist boats in Hong Kong, which has been part of history in Hong Kong public transportation. The vessels has air-conditioned banquet floor and outdoor upper deck. It stops at North Point and Hung Hom Pier. The cruises have A Symphony of Lights Dinner buffet, day and night charter, classic vehicular ferry, special event cruise such as Carrier Liaoning sightseeing cruise and advertisement wrap.

See also 
 Duk Ling
 Aqua Luna
 Hong Kong Ferry

References 

Victoria Harbour